Other Dimensions is a collection of stories by American writer Clark Ashton Smith. It was released in 1970 and was the author's sixth collection of stories published by Arkham House.  It was released in an edition of 3,144 copies.  The stories were originally published between 1910 and 1953 in Weird Tales and other pulp magazines.

Contents

Other Dimensions contains the following tales:

 "Marooned in Andromeda"
 "The Amazing Planet"
 "An Adventure in Futurity"
 "The Immeasurable Horror"
 "The Invisible City"
 "The Dimension of Chance"
 "The Metamorphosis of Earth"
 "Phoenix"
 "The Necromantic Tale"
 "The Venus of Azombeii"
 "The Resurrection of the Rattlesnake"
 "The Supernumerary Corpse"
 "The Mandrakes"
 "Thirteen Phantasms"
 "An Offering to the Moon"
 "Monsters in the Night"
 "The Malay Krise"
 "The Ghost of Mohammed Din"
 "The Mahout/ The Raja and the Tiger"
 "Something New"
 "The Justice of the Elephant"
 "The Kiss of Zoraida"
 "A Tale of Sir John Maundeville"
 "The Ghoul"
 "Told in the Desert"

See also
 Clark Ashton Smith bibliography

Sources

External links 

1970 short story collections
Fantasy short story collections
Science fiction short story collections by Clark Ashton Smith